Jiří Perůtka (born 22 February 1988) is a Czech football player who currently plays for Slovácko.

References

External links
 Guardian Football

1988 births
Living people
Czech footballers
Czech First League players
1. FC Slovácko players
MFK Karviná players

Association football midfielders